Luperosaurus yasumai is a species of gecko, a lizard in the family Gekkonidae. The species is endemic to  Indonesian Borneo.

Etymology
The specific name, yasumai, is in honor of Shigeki Yasuma, a Japanese biologist who has contributed to research and conservation of wildlife in Borneo.

Habitat
The preferred natural habitat of L. yasumai is forest.

Description
L. yasumai shares a close resemblance to Luperosaurus joloensis and Luperosaurus palawanensis. It has a few distinctions from its relatives in that it has fewer scansors on its seventh toe and it has a more depressed tail.

Reproduction
L. yasumai is oviparous.

References

Further reading
Ota H, Sengoku S, Hikida T (1996). "Two New Species of Luperosaurus (Reptilia: Gekkonidae) from Borneo". Copeia 1996 (2): 433–439. (Luperosaurus yasumai, new species).

Luperosaurus
Reptiles described in 1996
Reptiles of Indonesia
Endemic fauna of Indonesia
Endemic fauna of Borneo
Reptiles of Borneo